Justice in economics is a subcategory of welfare economics. It is a "set of moral and ethical principles for building economic institutions". Economic justice aims to create opportunities for every person to have a dignified, productive and creative life that extends beyond simple economics.

Models of economic justice frequently represent the ethical-social requirements of a given theory, whether "in the large", as of a just social order, or "in the small", as in the equity of "how institutions distribute  specific benefits and burdens".  That theory may or may not elicit acceptance. In the Journal of Economic Literature classification codes 'justice' is scrolled to at JEL: D63, wedged on the same line between 'Equity' and 'Inequality' along with 'Other Normative Criteria and Measurement'.  Categories above and below the line are Externalities and Altruism.

Some ideas about justice and ethics overlap with the origins of economic thought, often as to  distributive justice and sometimes as to Marxian analysis. The subject is a topic of normative economics and philosophy and economics.  In early welfare economics, where mentioned, 'justice' was little distinguished from maximization of all individual utility functions or a social welfare function.  As to the latter, Paul Samuelson (1947), expanding on work of Abram Bergson, represents a social welfare function in general terms as any ethical belief system required to order any (hypothetically feasible) social states for the entire society as "better than", "worse than", or "indifferent to" each other. Kenneth Arrow (1963) showed a difficulty of trying to extend a social welfare function consistently across different hypothetical ordinal utility functions even apart from justice.  Utility maximization survives, even with the rise of ordinal-utility/Pareto theory, as an ethical basis for economic-policy judgments in the wealth-maximization criterion invoked in law and economics. 

Amartya Sen (1970), Kenneth Arrow (1983), Serge-Christophe Kolm (1969, 1996, 2000), and others have considered ways in which utilitarianism as an approach to justice is constrained or challenged by independent claims of equality in the distribution of primary goods, liberty, entitlements, opportunity, exclusion of antisocial preferences, possible capabilities, and fairness as non-envy plus Pareto efficiency. Alternate approaches have treated combining concern for the worst off with economic efficiency,  the notion of personal responsibility and (de)merits of leveling individual benefits downward,  claims of intergenerational justice, and other non-welfarist/Pareto approaches.  Justice is a subarea of social choice theory, for example as to extended sympathy, and more generally in the work of Arrow, Sen, and others.  

A broad reinterpretation of justice from the perspective of game theory, social contract theory, and evolutionary naturalism is found in works of Ken Binmore (1994, 1998, 2004) and others. Arguments on fairness as an aspect of justice have been invoked to explain a wide range of behavioral and theoretical applications,supplementing earlier emphasis on economic efficiency (Konow, 2003).

See also

 Constitutional economics
 Cost-benefit analysis
 Deadweight loss
 Economic inequality
 Laffer curve
 Pareto efficiency
 Positive economics
 Poverty reduction
 Social equality
 Social justice
 Taxation as theft

References

Welfare economics
Game theory
Justice